Bristol, England is the tenth most populous city in the United Kingdom.

Population

Bristol's total population, according to the 2011 UK census, was 428,234. The population density was 4,022 people per square km.

Ethnicity

The following table shows the ethnic group of respondents in the 1991, 2001 and 2011 censuses in Bristol. Bristol has a strong White majority population, at 84%, which has declined from 94.5% in 1991. The largest ethnic group is the White British at 77.9% which have declined from 88% of the population in 2001. Black British residents are the 2nd biggest at 6% with Asian British at 5.5%.

Notes for table above

Languages

The most common main languages spoken in Bristol according to the 2011 census are shown below.

Religion

The following table shows the religion of respondents in the 2001, 2011 and 2021 censuses in Bristol.

See also

Demography of the United Kingdom
Demography of England
Demography of London
Demography of Birmingham
Demography of Greater Manchester
List of English cities by population
List of English districts by population
List of English districts and their ethnic composition
List of English districts by area
List of English districts by population density

References

Bristol
Bristol
Bristol